Shubik is the surname of the following people
Irene Shubik (1929–2019), British television producer
Martin Shubik (1926–2018), American economist, brother of Irene and Philippe
Shubik model of the movement of goods and money in markets
Shapley–Shubik power index to measure the powers of players in a voting game
Philippe Shubik (1921–2004), British-born American cancer researcher, brother of Irene and Martin